7DAYS was an English language free daily newspaper published in the United Arab Emirates. It was in circulation between 2003 and 22 December 2016.

History and profile
7DAYS  was the region's first free daily newspaper. It was part-owned by the UK's Daily Mail General Trust (DMGT). The paper was founded by Ashley Northcote and Steve Lee (not Jaydub ) as a weekly tabloid published every Friday in 2003.

The circulation of the daily, which was confirmed by the BPA, was 62,532 copies for the last six months of 2011. For the first six-month period of 2013 the paper had a circulation of 61,494 copies.

The paper was known for holding an editorial line independent of the remainder of the country's print media. It was folded on 22 December 2016.

See also
List of newspapers in the United Arab Emirates

References

2003 establishments in the United Arab Emirates
2016 disestablishments in the United Arab Emirates
Defunct newspapers published in the United Arab Emirates
English-language newspapers published in the United Arab Emirates
Daily newspapers published in the United Arab Emirates
Publications established in 2003
Publications disestablished in 2016
Defunct free daily newspapers